Story Television is an American digital broadcast television network owned by Weigel Broadcasting that airs programming which is related to history, normally older programs which are licensed from other networks.

The formation of the network was announced on February 14, 2022. Weigel president Neal Sabin stated: “As we looked at the landscape, we looked at what genre works really well for advertisers and viewership that isn’t currently on the air right now." The genre which was chosen would be history-oriented programming. The name "Story" directly came from "history", the word that will play in the shows' taglines.

The network was launched on March 28, 2022 on stations owned by Weigel, Hearst Television, Marantha Broadcasting Company, Marquee Broadcasting and others, along with national cable distribution through providers such as Spectrum where no affiliate exists.

Programming
Each day of the week has a different theme.

Monday: Military and Combat
Tuesday: Tech and Innovation
Wednesday: World Events
Thursday: American History
Friday: Modern Marvels
Saturday: Unexplained Phenomena
Sunday: Biography

The channel rebroadcasts programming that originally aired on cable networks such as A&E and History Channel.

Affiliates

Note: This list may not be complete

References

External links
 

Weigel Broadcasting
Television channels and stations established in 2022
Television channels and networks about history
Story Television
Television networks in the United States